In genetics, an insertion (also called an insertion mutation) is the addition of one or more nucleotide base pairs into a DNA sequence. This can often happen in microsatellite regions due to the DNA polymerase slipping.  Insertions can be anywhere in size from one base pair incorrectly inserted into a DNA sequence to a section of one chromosome inserted into another. The mechanism of the smallest single base insertion mutations is believed to be through base-pair separation between the template and primer strands followed by non-neighbor base stacking, which can occur locally within the DNA polymerase active site. On a chromosome level, an insertion refers to the insertion of a larger sequence into a chromosome. This can happen due to unequal crossover during meiosis.

N region addition is the addition of non-coded nucleotides during recombination by terminal deoxynucleotidyl transferase.

P nucleotide insertion is the insertion of palindromic sequences encoded by the ends of the recombining gene segments.

Trinucleotide repeats are classified as insertion mutations and sometimes as a separate class of mutations.

Effects
Insertions can be particularly hazardous if they occur in an exon, the amino acid coding region of a gene.  A frameshift mutation, an alteration in the normal reading frame of a gene, results if the number of inserted nucleotides is not divisible by three, i.e., the number of nucleotides per codon.  Frameshift mutations will alter all the amino acids encoded by the gene following the mutation.  Usually, insertions and the subsequent frameshift mutation will cause the active translation of the gene to encounter a premature stop codon, resulting in an end to translation and the production of a truncated protein.  Transcripts carrying the frameshift mutation may also be degraded through Nonsense-mediated decay during translation, thus not resulting in any protein product.  If translated, the truncated proteins frequently are unable to function properly or at all and can possibly result in any number of genetic disorders depending on the gene in which the insertion occurs. Methods to detect DNA sequencing errors were developed.

In-frame insertions occur when the reading frame is not altered as a result of the insertion; the number of inserted nucleotides is divisible by three.  The reading frame remains intact after the insertion and translation will most likely run to completion if the inserted nucleotides do not code for a stop codon.  However, because of the inserted nucleotides, the finished protein will contain, depending on the size of the insertion, multiple new amino acids that may affect the function of the protein.

See also
Indel
Insertional mutagenesis
Loss-of-Function Mutations
Gain-of-Function Mutations
 Deletion (genetics)

References

Further reading

Mutation